Julie Ward was a British woman who was killed whilst on safari in the Masai Mara game reserve in Kenya in September 1988. The subsequent investigation into her death was notable for the campaign by her father, John firstly to persuade the Kenyan authorities to recognise that his daughter was murdered, and secondly to try to identify the killer or killers. Three people were charged with her murder, although none has been convicted.

Death 
Julie Ward was a publishing assistant and amateur wildlife photographer from Bury St Edmunds in England. At the beginning of September 1988 she had been in Africa for seven months photographing wildlife and was due to return to England in about a week. She was travelling to the Masai Mara game reserve with an Australian friend, Dr. Glen Burns. On 5 September 1988 the vehicle they were driving, a Suzuki jeep, broke down; Dr Burns returned to Nairobi while Ward spent the night alone at the Mara Serena lodge. On 6 September the vehicle was repaired and Ward left to drive to the nearby Sand River camp to recover some camping equipment. This was the last time she was seen alive.

Ward was reported missing and her father John Ward flew to Kenya to find his daughter. He hired a plane to search the areas of the game reserve where his daughter was known to have camped alone. A pilot sighted the Suzuki Jeep in a gulley next to a river and Mr Ward went to investigate in person. Julie Ward's burned and dismembered body was found in the ashes of a fire by John Ward on 13 September.

Investigation 
The original theory put forth by the Kenyan officials was that Ward had been eaten by lions and struck by lightning; however, they later accepted that she was murdered after her father's efforts uncovered further evidence. The Kenyan coroner's report had been altered to disguise the fact that her bones had been cut by a sharp blade rather than gnawed by animals. A British pathologist found that Ward had been dismembered with a machete then doused in petrol and set alight.

John Ward, a retired hotelier, spent nearly £2 million on the investigation and made over 100 visits to Kenya. Ward has accused the Kenyan government and former President Daniel arap Moi of trying to cover up his daughter's murder to prevent damage to the tourist industry. A former MI6 agent has admitted having a role in the case.

Subsequent events 
In 1992, after the first of two trials, two junior park rangers were acquitted of her murder due to a lack of evidence. The presiding judge in the trial recommended the investigation of the head park ranger.

In 1997, the case was reexamined by a fresh team of Kenyan police.

In July 1998, Simon Ole Makallah, who was the chief park warden at the time of the murder, was arrested following a two-year investigation.

On 16 September 1999, Simon Ole Makallah was found not guilty at the second trial due to lack of evidence.

In 2004, a British inquest, held at Ipswich, recorded a verdict of unlawful killing.

In October 2009, the case was reopened after a secret visit, to Kenya, by John Yates, the head of the Metropolitan Police's anti-terrorism squad. In December 2009 Valentine Ohuru Kodipo, a key witness of the murder, died. Kodipo died in Denmark where he had lived in exile for more than 20 years. Ward's murder was so sensitive that Kodipo had fled Kenya following his testimony.

In 2018, John Ward campaigned in the media for the authorities in Kenya to obtain a DNA sample from the person he suspected of the crime.

See also
List of unsolved murders

References

Further reading
 Musila, Grace A. A Death Retold in Truth and Rumour - Kenya, Britain and the Julie Ward Murder. Boydell & Brewer. 
Ward, John. The Animals Are Innocent – The Search for Julie's Killers (Headline 1991). 
 

1988 murders in Kenya
Female murder victims
Tourism in Kenya
Unsolved murders in Kenya
Year of birth missing
British people murdered abroad
Violence against women in Kenya